The Boston University Questrom School of Business (formerly, the Boston University School of Management, commonly referred to as simply Questrom) is the business school of Boston University, a private research university in Boston, Massachusetts. Founded in 1913 as the College of Business Administration, the school offers undergraduate and graduate programs.

The BU Questrom School of Business offer a Bachelor of Science in Business Administration (BSBA), Master of Business Administration (MBA) degree (full- and part-time programs), a Master of Science (MS) in Mathematical Finance, a Master of Science in Management Studies (MSMS), executive education programs, and two Ph.D. programs. Both the undergraduate and graduate programs offer dual degree options with other schools and colleges at Boston University.

Questrom has some 250 full-time faculty and some 200 part-time faculty, teaching fellows, and active research assistants.

October 13, 1913, Boston University business began classes for students in the College of Business Administration. The first three courses were English, Spanish, and Advertising. The Spanish course was taught by Dean Everett Lord. The third course (Advertising) was taught by Charles E. Ballatty.

In March 2015, the name was changed from the School of Management to the current, Questrom School of Business. It was named for alumnus Allen Questrom, a former CEO of many department stores, who with his wife Kelli, donated $50 million to Boston University.

Rafik B. Hariri Building
The business school is housed in the Rafik B. Hariri Building, located at 595 Commonwealth Avenue. The building opened in October 1996 and contains over 40 classrooms, a 375-seat lecture hall, five computer labs, and the Frederick S. Pardee Management Library. The building offers wireless Internet access throughout as well as 4,000 wired data ports. A Breadwinners Deli and a wired Starbucks are located on the second floor of the building. The Hariri Building also contains 19 team rooms available only for undergraduate and graduate Questrom students to hold team meetings. Room reservations are made online.

The building is named after Rafik B. Hariri, the late former Prime Minister of Lebanon, who was a Boston University trustee. Hariri's two sons attended BU, and Hariri's philanthropic foundation made a donation for the construction of the new building.

Undergraduate programs
The BU Questrom School of Business offers undergraduate Bachelor of Science degrees in Business Administration with concentrations in Finance, Information Systems, Accounting, Marketing, Operations and Technology Management, Entrepreneurship, General Management, International Management, Organization Behavior, Business Law and Business Analytics. The Boston University Collaborative Degree Program is a program for a select group of students who choose to pursue a second degree in another field in another BU college; common BUCOP subjects include economics, mathematics, international relations, advertising, and engineering.

The BU Questrom School of Business's Honors Program, which began in 1998, is a business program to which academically talented freshmen and sophomores are invited.

In order to be admitted into the Honors Program sophomore year, students must have a minimum 3.5 GPA in at least 36 credits of completed academic coursework. The application process consists of a cover letter, a resume, an essay, two letters of recommendation, and a personal interview.

Graduate programs
The BU Questrom School of Business offers an online and residential Master of Business Administration (MBA), a Master of Science in Digital Innovation combined with an MBA (MBA/MSDi), a  Master of Science in Mathematical Finance (MSMF), a Master of Science in Management Studies (MSMS) and two Doctor of Philosophy (Ph.D.) degrees. The MBA degree is offered with concentrations in Social Impact and Health Sector Management (which can also be studied as part of the MBA/MSDi program). The two available Ph.D. degrees are in Management and Mathematical Finance.

Graduate programs enrolled 281 Full-time MBA, 406 Part-time MBA, 61 Executive MBA, and 50 Ph.D. students during the 2015–16 school year.

The school offers several MBA dual degree programs in conjunction with other BU schools:

MBA/JD in Law Management (with the School of Law)
MBA/JD in Health Sector Management (with the School of Law)
MBA/MD (with the School of Medicine)
MBA/MA in Medical Science (with the School of Medicine's Medical Science Division)
MBA/MPH in Health Care Management (with the School of Public Health)
MBA/MPH in Global Health Management (with the School of Public Health)
MBA/MA in economics (with the Graduate College of Arts and Sciences)
MBA/MS in International Relations (with the Graduate College of Arts and Sciences)
MBA/MS in Manufacturing Engineering (with the Department of Mechanical Engineering in the College of Engineering)
MBA/MS in Television Management (with the College of Communication)

Executive Education Programs
The Questrom School of Business offers several executive education programs and seminars as well as an 18-month Executive MBA program, which meets every other Friday through Saturday and offers professionals an opportunity to obtain an MBA and build management skills without leaving their jobs.

The Executive Leadership Center offers open registration and custom-designed management seminars, ranging from one day to several weeks.

International Field Seminars - Elective Courses Abroad
The Questrom School of Business offers several opportunities to study abroad during short, 3-credit international field seminars.  The Innovation Ecosystems Field Seminar focuses on tech innovation in Israel, with company visits in Tel Aviv and Jerusalem, and cultural visits to Masada and the Dead Sea.  The India Field Seminar explores the global forces of the health sector as they intersect with the dynamics of an emerging economy.  The Latin America Field Seminar, which takes place in both Chile and Argentina, focuses on the role of business in society as it relates to environmental sustainability, corporate social responsibility and the triple bottom line.  The Europe Field Seminar, which travels to Belgium, France, the Netherlands and Hungary, covers topics such as macroeconomic policy, European Integration, finance, international trade, and business culture.  The Asia Field Seminar focuses on China's economic development.

Notable alumni
Keith B. Alexander, Director, National Security Agency
 Norman Barron, Founder, Marshalls Department Store
Jay Cashman, CEO, Jay Cashman, Inc.
Millard Drexler, Former Chairman & CEO, J.Crew
Jim Brett, CEO, J.Crew
Jerald G. Fishman, CEO, Analog Devices
Meera Gandhi, Founder & CEO, The Giving Back Foundation
James F. Jeffrey, Ambassador, U.S. Department of State
Vincent Larusso, actor
 Peter J. Levine, General Partner, Andreessen Horowitz
Tom Magliozzi, Host, Car Talk
Don McGrath, CEO, BancWest Corp; Chairman & CEO, Bank of the West
Dirk Meyer, President & CEO, Advanced Micro Devices
Frederick S. Pardee, Former Researcher at the RAND Corporation, real estate investor, philanthropist.
John Perkins, Author, Confessions of an Economic Hit Man
Christine Poon, Former Vice Chairman, Johnson & Johnson
Allen Questrom, Retired Chairman and CEO of JC Penney and the namesake of the Questrom School of Business
Elizabeth H. Roberts, Lieutenant Governor, Rhode Island
Alfred Sant, Former Prime Minister, Republic of Malta
Aydin Senkut, Founder & Managing Partner, Felicis Ventures
Analjit Singh, Founder & Chairman Emeritus, Max Group
John F. Smith Jr.,  Retired Chairman & CEO, General Motors
John Svenson, co-founder, The Abbey Group and Part Owner, Boston Celtics
Tom Szkutak, CFO Amazon.com
Gerald Tsai, Former Chairman & CEO, Primerica
Edward Zander, Chairman & CEO, Motorola

See also
List of United States business school rankings
List of business schools in the United States

References

External links 
Boston University Questrom School of Business
Boston University

Management, School of
Business schools in Massachusetts
Educational institutions established in 1913
Buildings at Boston University
1913 establishments in Massachusetts